Planet Pirates is a science fiction trilogy written by Anne McCaffrey and two co-authors separately, Elizabeth Moon and Jody Lynn Nye. The three novels were published as paperback originals by Baen Books in 1990 and 1991, although the Doubleday Science Fiction Book Club (SFBC) issued hardcover editions of each within several months. Baen published an 890-page omnibus trade paperback edition in 1993 entitled The Planet Pirates.

The trilogy is set in a fictional universe, and partly on its fictional planet Ireta, that McCaffrey created in the 1978 novel Dinosaur Planet, published by Orbit Books and Del Rey Books. A sequel Dinosaur Planet Survivors followed in 1984 and Doubleday SFBC issued a 376-page omnibus edition of the two as The Ireta Adventure in 1985. The Internet Speculative Fiction Database (ISFDB) catalogs all five novels as constituting the Ireta series.

Series

 Sassinak (Baen Books, March 1990), by Anne McCaffrey and Elizabeth Moon
 The Death of Sleep (Baen, June 1990), McCaffrey and Jody Lynn Nye
 Generation Warriors (Baen, February 1991), McCaffrey and Moon

Omnibus edition: The Planet Pirates (Baen, October 1993), ; first hardcover edition December 2000,

Plot overviews
Sassinak – Sassinak was twelve when the raiders came. That made her just the right age: old enough to be used, young enough to be broken. But Sassinak turned out to be a little different from your typical slave girl. And finally, she escaped. But that was only the beginning for Sassinak. Now she's a fleet captain with a pirate-chasing ship of her own, and only one regret in life: too few pirates.
The Death of Sleep – Lunzie Mespil is a Therapist who specializes in treating patients who have suffered from extended periods of cold sleep. When the ship transporting her to her duty station is struck by an asteroid, Lunzie finds herself in an escape pod.  But she isn't too worried; she will spend a month or two in cryogenic stasis awaiting inevitable rescue, and then proceed with her life. Only it might not be a month or two... Waking up in a future she doesn't know, Lunzie must make a new life for herself, but disaster seems to follow her like a shadow.
Generation Warriors – Sassinak has made a career out of fighting the pirates that destroyed her home.  Through determination, and a certain disregard for personal safety, she has gained the wholehearted respect of her crew, human and heavyworlder alike.  Having found a new family in Fleet, she had long since abandoned her search for relatives, but in an unlikely turn of events, she may find not only the family she thought lost, but the key to the puzzle that has been her life's pursuit – and a plot as big as the Federation itself – but in order to bring those involved to justice, she will need all her training and skill... And more than a little luck.  After yet another long sleep, Lunzie finds herself called upon to help bring down a crime syndicate that has managed to remain hidden for more than a century.  But to do so will require her to face her two greatest fears.  Dupaynil thought himself clever.  And his assignment, to probe Sassinak's crew for a saboteur was certainly not beyond his ability, but he made a dreadful mistake in thinking that he was smarter than Sassinak.  Everyone knows that heavyworlders have long been a part of piracy, and new evidence proves it, but without proof that someone else is pulling their strings, the heavyworlders will take the blame, and those in charge will just start over somewhere else.  Fordeliton is Sassinak's executive officer and friend.  And maybe more than a friend.  But what Sassinak doesn't know yet, is that Ford has depths of his own.  And connections that could be the  key to determining once and for all who is behind the Planet Pirates.

References

External links
  — direct target is a record for a copy of the first printing

Book series introduced in 1990
Novels by Anne McCaffrey
Science fiction book series